Alex McHenry (born 7 October 1997) is an Irish rugby union player for RFU Championship club Jersey Reds. He plays as a centre.

Early life
Born in Cork, McHenry won the Munster Schools Rugby Senior Cup in 2016 with Christian Brothers College, alongside former Munster teammate Liam Coombes. Prior to this, McHenry had captained Munster under-19s to inter-provincial success in 2015, and also represented Munster under-18 Schools and Ireland under-19s.

Career

Cork Constitution
McHenry was part of the Cork Con team that won a treble during the 2016–17 season, winning the All-Ireland League, All-Ireland Cup and Munster Senior Cup, as well as winning a second Senior Cup and All-Ireland League during the 2018–19 season, and a third Senior Cup during the 2019–20 season.

Munster
McHenry made his debut for Munster A against English RFU Championship side Doncaster Knights in round 6 of the 2016–17 British and Irish Cup on 13 January 2017. Munster A won the match 24–16 to secure a home quarter-final in the tournament, which they eventually won by defeating Jersey Reds 29–28 in the final in April 2017, though McHenry was not part of the team on the day. He went on to then join the Munster academy ahead of the 2017–18 season. McHenry played in all 6 of Munster A's fixtures during the 2018–19 Celtic Cup, and also played for the 'A' team in their 38–19 win against Major League Rugby side New England Free Jacks in the Cara Cup in April 2019.

Following the win against New England, McHenry, along with other teammates from the 'A' team, were recalled to join up with the senior squad, and he was subsequently named as a replacement for the 2018–19 Pro14 round 20 fixture against Italian side Benetton on 12 April 2019. McHenry made his senior competitive debut for Munster when he came on as a replacement for Sammy Arnold during the match, which Munster won 37–28. He joined the Munster senior squad on a one-year contract ahead of the 2020–21 season and extended that deal by a further year in February 2021. McHenry scored his first try for Munster in their 31–17 win against Italian side Benetton in round 16 of the 2020–21 Pro14 on 19 March 2021. McHenry left Munster at the end of the 2021–22 season.

Loan to Wasps
McHenry joined English Premiership Rugby club Wasps on loan in October 2021, providing cover for the injured Malakai Fekitoa. He made his debut for the club in their 56–15 defeat against Saracens in round 6 of the 2021–22 Premiership Rugby season on 24 October 2021.

Jersey Reds
McHenry joined RFU Championship club Jersey Reds ahead of the 2022–23 season.

Ireland
McHenry won his first cap for Ireland under-20s in their 2017 Six Nations Under 20s Championship clash with France on 24 February 2017, which Ireland won 27–22. He also featured for the Ireland 7s team during the 2017–18 season.

Honours

Christian Brothers College
Munster Schools Rugby Senior Cup:
Winner (1): 2016

Cork Constitution
All-Ireland League Division 1A:
Winner (2): 2016–17, 2018–19
All-Ireland Cup:
Winner (1): 2016–17
Munster Senior Cup:
Winner (3): 2016–17, 2018–19, 2019–20

References

External links
Munster Senior Profile
URC Profile

1997 births
Living people
People educated at Christian Brothers College, Cork
Rugby union players from Cork (city)
Irish rugby union players
Cork Constitution players
Munster Rugby players
Wasps RFC players
Jersey Reds players
Ireland international rugby sevens players
Irish expatriate rugby union players
Expatriate rugby union players in England
Irish expatriate sportspeople in England
Expatriate rugby union players in Jersey
Irish expatriate sportspeople in Jersey
Rugby union centres